Phil Troy Murphy (born 4 December 1976 in St. John's, Newfoundland) is an Irish Canadian rugby union footballer who plays at No 8.

He previously played for London Irish and French side Perpignan.

He has 18 caps for his native Canada, although he has four caps at schoolboy level for Ireland. He has also played for the French Barbarians. In Canada he played for Oakville Crusaders. He made 126 appearances for the Exiles, scoring 10 tries. Murphy attended the University of Victoria in British Columbia.

In February 2008 it was announced that Murphy was to leave London Irish to join Italian side Viadana.

References

External links
London Irish profile

1976 births
Living people
Canadian rugby union players
Irish rugby union players
London Irish players
Leeds Tykes players
Sportspeople from St. John's, Newfoundland and Labrador
Canada international rugby union players
People educated at Methodist College Belfast
Canadian expatriate rugby union players
Irish expatriate rugby union players
Expatriate rugby union players in England
Expatriate rugby union players in France
Expatriate rugby union players in Italy
Canadian expatriate sportspeople in England
Canadian expatriate sportspeople in France
Canadian expatriate sportspeople in Italy
Irish expatriate sportspeople in England
Irish expatriate sportspeople in France
Irish expatriate sportspeople in Italy
Rugby union number eights